Physokentia tete is a species of flowering plant in the family Arecaceae. It is found only in Vanuatu. It is threatened by habitat loss.

References

tete
Trees of Vanuatu
Near threatened plants
Endemic flora of Vanuatu
Taxonomy articles created by Polbot
Taxa named by Odoardo Beccari